The Changjin Line is an electrified narrow gauge line of the North Korean State Railway running from Yŏnggwang on the Sinhŭng Line to Sasu on Lake Changjin. There is a  cable-hauled section between Samgo and Hwangch'oryong; between Pojang and Hwangch'oryong the grade reaches 370‰.

History 

In 1923 the privately owned Sinhŭng Railway opened the mainline of its Hamnam Line (not to be confused with the line of the same name of the Chosen Magnesite Development Railway, nowadays called Kŭmgol Line), from Hamhŭng to Sinhŭng via Oro (nowadays called Yŏnggwang), and subsequently expanded the line with the addition of a branch from Oro to Sangt'ong that was opened on 1 October 1926.

In 1934, to aid in the construction of a new hydroelectric power plant on the Changjin River, and to exploit forestry and other resources in the area, the Sinhŭng Railway began opening its Changjin Line. The first section, from Sangt'ong to Samgŏ, was opened on 1 September 1934, followed by an extension from Samgŏ to Kujin on 1 November of the same year. Later, the Sindae—Kujin section was closed on 15 July 1935, followed by the closure of the Sasu—Sindae section on 30 August 1935.

The Sinhŭng Railway was bought and absorbed by the Chosen Railway on 22 April 1938.

Following the establishment of the DPRK, all railways in North Korea were nationalised, becoming part of the Korean State Railway. The Chosen Railway's Hamnam, Songhŭng and Changjin Lines were split up, with the mainline of the Hamnam Line and the Songhŭng Line merged to become the Sinhŭng Line, while the Yŏnggwang—Sang'tong branch was split off from the Hamnam Line and added to the Changjin Line, and the line was later electrified. Although the Hamhŭng—Sinhŭng section was rebuilt to standard gauge by the Korean State Railway, the Changjin Line remained narrow gauge.

Services 
Although significant for passenger transport in the area, the bulk of the trains on the Changjin Line are for freight transport, with the majority of traffic being outbound cargo - in the mid 1980s, 62.1% of all freight traffic originated on the line for shipment elsewhere, while only 37.9% being traffic from elsewhere destined for points on the line. Wood accounts for the vast majority of outbound freight - up to 78.8% in the 1980s, with grain, ore and metals being the other major commodities. Of inbound goods, coal is the most important at 36.7% of the total (of which up to 20% is anthracite), followed by rice and other grains (18.9%), fertiliser (11.9%), sea products (8.2%) and cement (4.2%).

Route 

A yellow background in the "Distance" box indicates that section of the line is not electrified; a pink background indicates that section is  narrow gauge; an orange background indicates that section is non-electrified narrow gauge.

References

 Ministry of Railways (1937), 鉄道停車場一覧. 昭和12年10月1日現在(The list of the stations, Status as of 1 October 1937), Kawaguchi Printing, p511, 517

Railway lines in North Korea
2 ft 6 in gauge railways in North Korea
Railway lines opened in 1926